Kathryn Thomas (born 20 January 1979) is an Irish television presenter.

Early life
Thomas attended the national school on the Green Road, Carlow and began her secondary school years in St Leo's College, Carlow. In her second year, she transitioned to The King's Hospital in Dublin as a boarder. She studied Arts (English, Sociology and Information Studies) at University College Dublin but left before finishing as she won a contract to present the children's television programme Rapid. She also took London Guildhall acting exams to Grade 8.

Television
Thomas's break into television came when she co-presented Rapid, a youth sports show, with Dublin GAA star Jason Sherlock during the 1990s.

Thomas worked on the television series No Frontiers, which included assignment stories about boomeranging in Australia, bungee jumping in New Zealand, child trafficking in Namibia, and American football.

In 2008, Thomas co-presented Winning Streak: Dream Ticket with Aidan Power. From 2009, she co-presented the show with Marty Whelan. She left Winning Streak in December 2011.

In 2011, she became the new presenter of Operation Transformation on RTÉ One. In August 2011, it was announced that she would host the Irish version of The Voice, The Voice of Ireland.

In February 2012, Thomas stormed the stage during a performance by Alabama 3 at the 9th Irish Film & Television Awards, and wagged her finger at the rock band after they sang a song with the lyrics "fuck the police". She accused the band of inciting people to violence.

Radio
Thomas has stepped in for John Murray on RTÉ Radio 1 and also hosts an RTÉ Radio 1 quiz show.

Personal life
Thomas, had a five-year relationship with Garda Enda Waters, which ended in July 2012. She has been dating businessman Padraig McLoughlin since mid-2013.

In 2017, Thomas announced through Instagram that she and McLoughlin were expecting their first child together. In March 2018, Thomas had her first daughter, Ellie McLoughlin. She announced via Instagram in June 2021 that she and McLoughlin were expecting their second child. She lives in Inchicore.

Thomas revealed in 2015 that a series of shooting stars inked on the inside of her lower left arm were not tattoos but were in fact transfers.

Commercial ventures
In April 2015 Thomas set up Pure Results Bootcamp, a seven-day diet and exercise camp operating out of Inish Beg Island, a private Island Estate in West Cork, Ireland. The camp programme includes a pre-camp consultation with a nutritionist to establish the participants' goals, a shared room in a courtyard cottage, a two-week post-camp fitness and diet programme and two weekly weigh-ins with a member of the Pure Results Bootcamp team.

Awards
In 2005, Thomas won the Travel Extra Irish Travel Writer of the Year.

In 2008, she won the Sony Bravia TV Personality of the Year at the Irish Film and Television Awards (IFTAs) in Dublin, as well as Best Female Presenter at the TV Now Awards.

In February 2012, she came third in a poll to find Ireland's most desirable Valentines.

References

1979 births
20th-century Irish people
21st-century Irish people
Living people
Alumni of University College Dublin
RTÉ television presenters
People from County Carlow
RTÉ Radio 1 presenters
Irish game show hosts
Irish women radio presenters
Irish women television presenters
You're a Star contestants
People educated at The King's Hospital